Magnus Hagen Clausen, better known as Morgan Sulele (born in Bærum, Norway) is a Norwegian singer and songwriter. He got his local breakthrough with the Song "Bare Min", which was #1 in the Norwegian Chart for 6 weeks, and has over 300 million streams as a solo artist. 

As a songwriter he has been nominated for "Song Of The Year" at the Norwegian Spellemannsprisen awards, "Best Dance" with Tungevaags "All For Love" at the Swedish Grammis, which he also co-produced, and he co-wrote the song "In My Mind" for Alok and John Legend in the summer of 2021, and has also written for DJ/Producers Matoma and John De Sohn.

Discography

Albums

Singles

References

Living people
Musicians from Bærum
Year of birth missing (living people)